Ely Cheikh Samba Ould Voulany (born 31 December 1988) is a Mauritanian footballer who plays as a forward for the Mauritania national team.

International career
Voulany made his debut for Mauritania on 13 June 2008 against Ethiopia. He was included in Mauritania's squad for 2014 and 2018 African Nations Championship.

Career statistics

International
Statistics accurate as of match played 24 March 2018

International goals
Scores and results list Mauritania's goal tally first.

Honours 
Ligue 1 Mauritania: winner (2011–12, 2015–16)
Coupe du Président de la République: winner (2010, 2011, 2012, 2016)

References

External links
 
 

1988 births
Living people
Mauritanian footballers
Mauritania international footballers
Association football forwards
FC Tevragh-Zeina players
Al-Nahda Club (Oman) players
Talaba SC players
Al-Mina'a SC players
Wej SC players
Kumait FC players
Saudi Second Division players
2014 African Nations Championship players
Mauritanian expatriate sportspeople in Oman
Expatriate footballers in Oman
Expatriate footballers in Iraq
Expatriate footballers in Saudi Arabia
Mauritanian expatriate sportspeople in Saudi Arabia
Mauritanian expatriate footballers
Mauritanian expatriate sportspeople in Iraq
Mauritania A' international footballers
2018 African Nations Championship players